Yasen Petrov Petrov (born 23 June 1968) is a Bulgarian former football player. His nickname is Giannini from Plovdiv.

Career
Born in Plovdiv, Bulgaria, Petrov played for the PFC Botev Plovdiv, PFC Levski Sofia, PFC Slavia Sofia and PFC Lokomotiv Sofia. He also played for the Bulgaria national team.

Manager
He has managed PFC Lokomotiv Sofia, PFC Botev Plovdiv, and PFC Cherno More Varna. His most famous achievement as a coach is his debut for Lokomotiv Plovdiv, beating his old team and eternal city rivals Botev Plovdiv 4–0.

Levski Sofia
On 20 May 2010, Yasen Petrov was presented as a new head coach of Levski Sofia. He started great after a win in the Eternal Derby. Then after series of good matches, Levski qualified for UEFA Europa League after eliminating Dundalk F.C., Kalmar FF and AIK Fotboll. Levski was drawn in Group C, facing Gent, Lille and Sporting CP. At the end of the season, Levski Sofia finished 2nd and Petrov was released from the club.

Managing career abroad
Petrov has also worked as manager of teams in China.

Bulgaria
In January 2021, Petrov was appointed as manager of Bulgaria. His first match in charge of the team was a March 2021  World Cup qualifier against Switzerland, which Bulgaria lost by a score of 1:3. On 5 June 2022, Petrov resigned after a 2:5 loss against Georgia in a  Nations League match.

Awards
 As a player
 Bulgarian Cup (2): 1992, 1995
 As a manager
Cherno More Varna:
 Bulgarian Cup:
(Runner-up): 2006
Shijiazhuang Ever Bright F.C.:
 China League One:
(Runner-up): 2014

Managerial Statistics

References

1968 births
Living people
Bulgarian footballers
Bulgarian expatriate footballers
Bulgaria international footballers
First Professional Football League (Bulgaria) players
Cypriot First Division players
Botev Plovdiv players
FC Lokomotiv 1929 Sofia players
Alki Larnaca FC players
PFC Levski Sofia players
PFC Slavia Sofia players
PFC Lokomotiv Plovdiv players
PFC Pirin Gotse Delchev players
SV Meppen players
Tennis Borussia Berlin players
Wuhan Guanggu players
Jiangsu F.C. players
Chengdu Tiancheng F.C. players
Expatriate footballers in China
Expatriate footballers in Cyprus
Expatriate footballers in Germany
Bulgarian football managers
Botev Plovdiv managers
PFC Cherno More Varna managers
PFC Lokomotiv Plovdiv managers
PFC Levski Sofia managers
FC Lokomotiv 1929 Sofia managers
Cangzhou Mighty Lions F.C. managers
Expatriate football managers in China
Association football midfielders